This is a list of awards and nominations received by Swedish DJ and producer, Avicii (1989–2018).

American Music Awards
The American Music Awards is an annual American music awards show created by Dick Clark in 1973, which airs on ABC. Avicii received three nominations and won one.

|-
|2013
|rowspan="3"|Avicii
| Favorite Electronic Dance Music Artist
|
|-
|2014
|Favorite Electronic Dance Music Artist
|
|-
|2019
|Favorite Electronic Dance Music Artist
|
|}

Billboard Music Awards
The Billboard Music Awards are an annual awards show from Billboard Magazine, Avicii received six nominations and won once.

|-
|rowspan="4"| 2014 ||rowspan="2"| "Wake Me Up" || Top Radio Song || 
|-
|Top Dance/Electronic Song || 
|-
| True || Top Dance/Electronic Album || 
|-
| Avicii || Top Dance/Electronic Artist || 
|-
|2015 || Avicii || Top Dance/Electronic Artist || 
|-
|2018
| Avīci (01) || Top Dance/Electronic Album || 
|-
|rowspan=2|2020
| Avicii || Top Dance/Electronic Artist || 
|-
| Tim || Top Dance/Electronic Album || 
|}

DJ Magazine top 100 DJs

Echo Music Awards
The Echo Music Awards is an annual music awards ceremony presented by Deutsche Phono-Akademie in Germany. Avicii won two awards.

|-
|rowspan="2"|2014
|rowspan="2"|Avicii
|Electronic Dance Music National/International
|rowspan=2 
|-
|Hit des Jahres
|}

GAFFA Awards

Denmark GAFFA Awards
Delivered since 1991, the GAFFA Awards are a Danish award that rewards popular music by the magazine of the same name.

!
|-
| 2013
| Himself
| Best Foreign New Act
| 
| style="text-align:center;" |
|-
|}

Sweden GAFFA Awards
Delivered since 2010, the GAFFA Awards (Swedish: GAFFA Priset) are a Swedish award that rewards popular music awarded by the magazine of the same name.

!
|-
| 2014
| True: Avicii by Avicii
| Best Dance
| 
| style="text-align:center;" |
|-
|}

Grammis Awards
The Grammis are music awards presented annually to musicians and songwriters in Sweden. The oldest Swedish music awards, they were instituted as a local equivalent of the Grammy Awards given in the United States.

Grammy Awards
The Grammy Awards are awarded by the National Academy of Recording Arts and Sciences of the United States. Avicii received no awards from two nominations.

|-
| 2012|| "Sunshine" (David Guetta & Avicii) || Best Dance Recording || 
|-
| 2013 || "Levels" || Best Dance Recording || 
|}

iHeartRadio Music Awards
The iHeartRadio Music Awards is an awards show created by iHeartRadio. Avicii received two nominations and won an award.

|-
| rowspan="2"| 2014 || rowspan="2"| "Wake Me Up" || Best Lyrics || 
|-
| EDM Song of the Year || 
|}

International Dance Music Awards
The International Dance Music Awards are held annually as part of the Winter Music Conference. Avicii has received four nominations and won one.

|-
|rowspan="4"| 2013
|rowspan="3"|Avicii
|Best Artist (Solo)
|
|-
|Best European DJ
|rowspan=3 
|-
|Best Remixer
|-
|Levels Podcast
|Best Podcast
|-
| 2020
| TIM
| Best Album
| 
|}

MTV Europe Music Awards
The MTV Europe Music Awards were established in 1994 by MTV Networks Europe, Avicii received seven nominations and won three.

|-
| rowspan="2"| 2012 || rowspan="9"| Avicii || Best Electronic || 
|-
| Best Swedish Act || 
|-
| rowspan="3"| 2013 || Best Electronic || 
|-
|Best Swedish Act || 
|-
|Best Northern European Act || 
|-
|rowspan="2"| 2015|| Best Electronic||
|-
|Best Swedish Act || 
|-
|rowspan="1"| 2018|| Best Swedish Act || 
|-
|rowspan="1"| 2019|| Best Swedish Act ||  
|-

MTV Video Music Awards
The MTV Video Music Awards are presented annually by MTV and honor accomplishments in the music video medium. Avicii has received six nominations.

|-
|rowspan="2"|2012
|rowspan="2"|"Levels"
|Best Electronic Dance Music Video
|rowspan=4 
|-
|Best Choreography
|-
|rowspan="2"|2014
|"Wake Me Up"
|Best Pop Video
|-
|"Hey Brother"
|Best Video with a Social Message
|-
|rowspan="2"|2018
| rowspan="2"| "Lonely Together" (feat. Rita Ora)
| Best Dance Video
| 
|-
| Best Visual Effects
| 
|-
|}

Teen Choice Awards
The Teen Choice Awards is an annual award ceremony to honour the year's biggest achievements in entertainment and is voted by teen viewers. Avicii has won an award.

|-
|| 2014
|"Wake Me Up"
|Choice EDM Song
|
|}

World Music Awards
The World Music Awards is an annual awards ceremony that honors best selling artists in the record industry. Avicii received eight nominations.

|-
|rowspan="8"| 2014 || rowspan="2"| "Wake Me Up" || World's Best Song || 
|-
| World's Best Video || 
|-
|| True || World's Best Album || 
|-
|rowspan="5"| Avicii || World's Best Male || 
|-
|World's Best Live Act || 
|-
|World's Best Electronic Dance Artist || 
|-
|World's Best Entertainer of the Year || 
|-
|World's Best Swedish Act || 
|}

References

Avicii
Awards